Iphimoides is a genus of leaf beetles in the subfamily Eumolpinae. They are distributed in southeastern Asia and southern China.

Species
Subgenus Iphimoides Jacoby, 1883
 Iphimoides binhanus Pic, 1928 – North Vietnam
 Iphimoides celebensis Jacoby, 1883 – Sulawesi
 Iphimoides fabianae Zoia, 2004 – Malaysia
 Iphimoides fulvus Medvedev, 2004 – Laos
 Iphimoides pallidulus (Jacoby, 1889) – Burma, Vietnam, southern China
Subgenus Clisitherella Chen, 1940
 Iphimoides suturalis Pic, 1928 – China, Vietnam

Synonyms:
 Iphimoides cheni Medvedev, 2001: synonym of Iphimoides suturalis Pic, 1928
 Iphimoides fukienensis (Tan, 1983): synonym of Iphimoides suturalis Pic, 1928
 Iphimoides suturalis (Chen, 1940): synonym of Iphimoides suturalis Pic, 1928

References

Eumolpinae
Chrysomelidae genera
Beetles of Asia
Taxa named by Martin Jacoby